"MoneyGrabber" is a song by American band Fitz and the Tantrums from their debut 2010 studio album, Pickin' Up the Pieces. The song was released as an official single by Dangerbird Records on August 15, 2011. 
The song was used in the 2013 commercial for New Amsterdam Vodka. It also appeared in Season 6, episode 5 of the television show Criminal Minds.

Music video
The music video for "MoneyGrabber" was directed by Michael Mohan. The video depicts the band performing under red and blue stage lights.

Tracks 
Promo CD-Single Dangerbird / V2
 MoneyGrabber - 3:09

CD Single Dangerbird Records – VVNL21933, V2 – VVNL21933
 MoneyGrabber  - 3:09 	
 Breakin' the Chains of Love (Live From Candor) - 3:17

Charts

Certifications

References

2011 singles
Fitz and The Tantrums songs